Tecovas is an American retailer of cowboy boots and Western-style apparel. The company got its start by Paul Hedrick as a direct-to-consumer business and is headquartered in Austin, Texas. Along with cowboy boots, Tecovas also sells leather accessories and denim products.

History
According to popular sources, Hedrick, a Texas native, graduated from Harvard and began working as a management consultant in Greenwich, Connecticut, where he found it difficult to purchase cowboy boots. He started designing and manufacturing boots in Leon, Mexico, before launching the online retailer in 2015. The company is named for the geological formation Tecovas Creek, allegedly due to the founder's dream of becoming a paleontologist.

In addition to its online sales, the company began opening brick and mortar stores in 2019, with locations across several states. During the COVID-19 pandemic, Tecovas opened seven new physical locations.  Sales have grown primarily as a result of digital advertising, with New York and Chicago emerging as two of the company's largest markets.

References

External links
Official website

Companies based in Austin, Texas
Boots
American companies established in 2015
Online retailers of the United States
Clothing retailers of the United States
Clothing companies of the United States
Companies based in Texas